Giancarlo Gregorio Maldonado Marrero (born 29 June 1982) is a Venezuelan footballer who plays as a striker.

Club career

River Plate
Maldonado began his footballing career in Uruguay, where he started out in the youth teams of Montevideo club River Plate, going on his first team debut in 1999 but first team opportunities were limited and he twice returned to his home country of Venezuela on loan. First he went on loan to Nacional Táchira, where his father was the manager, for the 2001–2002 season and despite only scoring 8 goals he helped the now defunct club to their only title. The following season Maldonado was on loan at Mineros de Guayana.

Maracaibo
In 2003 Maldonado signed for Unión Atlético Maracaibo where he stayed for three seasons and scored 22 goals. During his time at the club he played 5 games without scoring in the 2004 Copa Libertadores and scored 3 goals in his 6 appearances in the 2006 Copa Libertadores.

O'Higgins
In 2006 Maldonado joined Chilean club O'Higgins where he scored 21 goals in his 42 appearances.

Atlante
Maldonado joined México Primera División side Atlante F.C. in July 2007, scoring on his debut in a friendly against Tecamachalco. He made his league debut for Atlante on 4 August 2007 against Jaguares scoring his side's only goal in a match that finished in a 1–1 draw. His goals for Atlante helped the team win the Apertura 2007 title, their third title and an historic one in their first season since relocating from Mexico City to Cancún, Mexico. Maldonado finished the Apertura 2007 campaign as second top goalscorer with 18 goals. His 18 goals for Atlante and the 8 that he had scored earlier in the year with C.D. O'Higgins earned him the 2007 Golden Boot of the Americas award, sharing the honour with Martín Palermo of Boca Juniors. In the Clausura 2008, Maldonado was again Atlante's top scorer, this time with 7 goals, the reigning champions Atlante were however unable to defend their title, missing out on the playoffs following a 3–2 loss to C.F. Monterrey.

Having won the Apertura 2007 Atlante qualified for the CONCACAF Champions League 2008–09. Maldonado scored in the knock out stages, helping Atlante to the Final of the competition where they defeated Cruz Azul 2–0 on aggregate.

Xerez
Maldonado was signed for an undisclosed fee by newly promoted Spanish La Liga club Xerez C.D. on 25 August 2009 after impressing for Atlante in the 2009 Peace Cup in Málaga, Spain. He made his league debut for Xerez on 30 August 2009 in a 2–0 loss to RCD Mallorca and left the club on 30 December 2009 to join his former club Atlante F.C.

Chivas
Maldonado was signed by Chivas USA during the summer transfer widow after spending two years with Atlante. He had three goals and one assist in league and Superliga. His contract option was declined after only scoring two goals in 10 appearances in league games.

Atlas
Maldonado was transferred on loan to Club Atlas on 5 December 2011. After long negotiations Maldonado was bought by Atlas on 20 December 2011 but had to give Ricardo Jimenez and Hebert Alferez transfers and some money to Atlante so the transfer could happen.

International career
Having made a name for himself as a promising young attacker playing in the youth ranks of River Plate, the Uruguayan Football Association approached him to play at youth level for the Uruguay national team. Maldonado rejected the offers however and chose instead to play for Venezuela, his county of birth and to help the sport in Venezuela.

Maldonado, Venezuela's all-time leading goal scorer, made his debut for the national team on 20 August 2003 in a friendly against Haiti which finished 3–2 to Venezuela. He scored his first international goal for Venezuela on 9 February 2005 in a 3–0 win over Estonian national football team. He played for Venezuela in the Copa América 2007, scoring Venezuela's opening goal of the tournament in the 2–2 draw with Bolivia and helping them make it through the first round for the first time ever. Venezuela would later exit the tournament after losing 4–1 to Uruguay.

Maldonado scored the first goal in a historic match where Venezuela beat Brazil 2–0 in a friendly match played in front of 54,045 fans in Boston, USA. The result marked the first time Venezuela had ever recorded a victory against the Brazilians in 17 attempts.

Maldonado also played a key role in Venezuela's 2010 World Cup Qualification campaign, scoring 6 goals in 15 appearances.

Personal life
He is the son of Carlos Maldonado (born 1963) who was also a professional football player. Maldonado was named after 1982 World Cup winning Italian Midfielder Giancarlo Antognoni. His uncle Saúl Maldonado is also professional football manager, and his two cousins Javier and Andres also play professional football in Venezuela.

Career statistics

Club
Accurate as of 14 September 2012

International goals

Honours

Club
Nacional Táchira
 Primera División (1): 2001–02

Unión Atlético Maracaibo
 Primera División (1): 2003–04

Atlante
 Primera División de México (1): 2007 Apertura
 CONCACAF Champions League (1): 2008–09

International
 Copa América (1): Fourth place 2011

Individual
 Bota de Oro (1): 2007

References

External links
 
 
 
 

1982 births
Living people
People from San Cristóbal, Táchira
Association football forwards
Venezuelan footballers
Venezuela international footballers
2007 Copa América players
2011 Copa América players
Club Atlético River Plate (Montevideo) players
A.C.C.D. Mineros de Guayana players
UA Maracaibo players
O'Higgins F.C. footballers
Atlante F.C. footballers
Xerez CD footballers
Chivas USA players
Atlas F.C. footballers
Deportivo Táchira F.C. players
Estudiantes de Mérida players
Real C.D. España players
La Liga players
Chilean Primera División players
Liga MX players
Venezuelan expatriate footballers
Venezuelan expatriate sportspeople in Chile
Venezuelan expatriate sportspeople in Mexico
Venezuelan expatriate sportspeople in Uruguay
Venezuelan expatriate sportspeople in Spain
Venezuelan expatriate sportspeople in the United States
Expatriate footballers in Chile
Expatriate footballers in Mexico
Expatriate footballers in Uruguay
Expatriate footballers in Spain
Expatriate soccer players in the United States
Major League Soccer players